Yoe is an English surname. It is a variant spelling of Yeo, meaning "river". According to statistics cited by Patrick Hanks, there were 16 people on the island of Great Britain and none on the island of Ireland with the surname Yoe as of 2011. In 1881 there had been 55 people with the surname in Great Britain, primarily in Devon. In the United States, the 2010 Census found 509 people with the surname Yoe, making it the 42,579th-most-common name in the country.

Notable people with the surname include:

A. C. De Yoe, American U.S. Army service member and politician
Craig Yoe (born 1951), American author

See also
Shwe Yoe (1890-1945), Burmese actor (Burmese names do not have surnames)

References

English-language surnames